René Robert (4 March 1936 – 20 January 2022) was a Swiss photographer who specialized in photographing flamenco artists.

Life and career
Born in 1936 in Fribourg, Robert discovered photography at the age of 12. He had a three-year apprenticeship in Lausanne before working for a press agency in Geneva. In the mid-1960s, he moved to Paris, where he met a Swedish dancer who introduced him to the flamenco. In 1967, he became one of the great portrait photographers.

Death 

Robert died of hypothermia on 20 January 2022, at the age of 85. 

His death was subsequently the subject of media debate around public indifference to street people.

Personal life

He is survived by his daughter Dorothee Mazet, who lives in Serifontaine, France.

Publications
La rage & la grâce, les flamencos (2001)
Flamenco attitudes (2003)

Exhibitions
"Un itinéraire en flamenco" (2015, Carré d'Art, Nîmes)
Third Biennial of Flamenco Art (2017, Palais de Chaillot, Paris)
"Chaillot, mémoire de la danse" (2018, Palais de Chaillot, Paris)
"La caméra au rythme du flamenco" (2019, Espace Cosmopolis, Nantes).

Public collections
Bibliothèque nationale de France

References

1936 births
2022 deaths
People from Fribourg
Swiss photographers
Deaths from hypothermia